The New Zealand cricket team toured Bangladesh from 5 to 17 October 2010 for a five-match One Day Internationals (ODI) series. Bangladesh won four and the other was abandoned without play. This was Bangladesh's first series victory against a full-strength Test-playing nation (excepting the West Indies series plagued by strike).

ODI series

1st ODI

2nd ODI

3rd ODI

4th ODI

5th ODI

References

2010 in New Zealand cricket
2010 in Bangladeshi cricket
2010-11
International cricket competitions in 2010–11
Bangladeshi cricket seasons from 2000–01